Young Woman with a Lapdog is a  1665 oil-on-canvas painting of an unknown young woman by Rembrandt. It is now in the Art Gallery of Ontario, to which it was bequeathed in 1955 by the philanthropist Frank Peter Wood. It was previously identified as Rembrandt's daughter-in-law Magdalena van Loo (1641–1669), but the subject is now held to be unknown. 

X-radiographs reveal significant changes to the bottom half of the painting as Rembrandt explored lighting and color. According to Ernst van de Wetering, this aspect of the work reveals "the 'Late Rembrandt' at his best". The painting is not signed, but may have been before later overpainting.

Notes

External links
Art Gallery of Ontario

1665 paintings
Portraits by Rembrandt
Collections of the Art Gallery of Ontario
Portraits of women
17th-century portraits
Dogs in art